Wrexham County Borough is a county borough in the north-east of Wales.

The Cadw/ICOMOS Register of Parks and Gardens of Special Historic Interest in Wales was established in 2002 and given statutory status in 2022. It is administered by Cadw, the historic environment agency of the Welsh Government.  It includes just under 400 sites, ranging from gardens of private houses, to cemeteries and public parks. Parks and gardens are listed at one of three grades, matching the grading system used for listed buildings. Grade I is the highest grade, for sites of exceptional interest; Grade II*, the next highest, denotes parks and gardens of more than special interest; while Grade II denotes nationally important sites of special interest.

There are 17 registered parks and gardens in Wrexham. Three are listed at grade I, three at grade II*, and eleven at grade II.

List of parks and gardens

|}

See also

 List of scheduled monuments in Wrexham County Borough
 Grade I listed buildings in Wrexham County Borough
 Grade II* listed buildings in Wrexham County Borough

Notes

References

Wrexham County Borough
Wrexham